Robert Haimer (March 2, 1954 – March 4, 2023) was an American musician, singer and songwriter.

Haimer performed in the two-man band Barnes & Barnes as his stage persona Artie Barnes, alongside actor and musician Bill Mumy. Barnes & Barnes are best known for their 1978 novelty song "Fish Heads."

Haimer also collaborated with the band America. He was featured on  View from the Ground (1982), Your Move (1983), Perspective (1984), Encore: More Greatest Hits (1991), and Hourglass (1994).

Haimer died on March 4, 2023, two days after his 69th birthday.

References

External links

YouTube channel
 

1954 births
2023 deaths
Musicians from Los Angeles
Place of birth missing (living people)